is a Japanese actor.

Biography 
Born in Yao, Osaka, he studied at Shimizudani High School, and eventually dropped out of Kwansei Gakuin University to pursue a career in acting. He began by joining the sho-gekijo theatrical troupe "Under Thirty," which was known for the membership of another famous actor, Watanabe Eriko, at the time. Though like many new theatre actors at the time, he struggled to make ends meet until he got his first big break in 1992, in the television drama Night Head alongside Shinji Takeda, as one of two brothers with supernatural powers.

In 1993 he won the "Newcomer of the Year" award for his drama Kira Kira Hikaru, and the Popularity Award in 1996 for his work in the drama Love Letter.

He also won the Japanese Academy Award as best supporting actor three times, the Hochi Film Award for Love Letter, No Way Back and Hanako.

Selected filmography

Film

Television

Video games 
 Lost Odyssey (2008)

References

External links 

1962 births
Living people
Japanese male film actors
Japanese male television actors
Male actors from Osaka
People from Yao, Osaka
20th-century Japanese male actors
21st-century Japanese male actors